Tour Generación RBD En Vivo is the first live material release of Mexican pop group RBD. The video was released on 26 August 2005 in Mexico and on 8 November 2005 in the United States. The DVD includes footage of RBD's first concert tour, Tour Generación RBD, which OCESA certified the No. 1 tour of 2005 in Mexico. The tour was seen by over 900,000 fans and visited over 30 Mexican cities, as well as Venezuela, Colombia, Puerto Rico and Ecuador. The live performances shown in the release were filmed during RBD's 7 concerts at the Palacio de los Deportes in Mexico City.

The DVD includes a whole live concert film, a documentary with never-before-seen footage of the group while on tour in its Mexican release, and on the edition released in the United States, a photo gallery.

Track listings
Tour Generación RBD En Vivo – 
"Rebelde"
"Otro Día Que Va"
"Santa No Soy"
"Medley 1" ("Me He Enamorado De Un Fan"/"No Sé Si Es Amor"/"Ámame Hasta Con Los Dientes"/"Rayo Rebelde"/"Baile Del Sapo"/"Me Vale")
 "Enséñame"
"Futuro Ex-Novio"
"Cuando El Amor Se Acaba"
"Liso, Sensual"
"A Rabiar"
"Una Canción"
"Medley 2" ("Cuando Baja La Marea"/"Te Quiero"/"Verano Peligroso"/"Devuélveme A Mi Chica"/"La Chica Del Bikini Azul"/"Viviendo De Noche"/"De Música Ligera"/"Es Mejor Así")
"Fuego"
"Sálvame"
 "Tenerte Y Quererte"
"Un poco de tu amor"
"Solo quédate en silencio"
"Rebelde" (Cumbia version)
Bonus material:
Documentary

Tour Generación RBD En Vivo – 
Bonus material:
Photo gallery

Personnel
Credits adapted from the DVD's liner notes.

Mastered at
 Cosmos Mastering, Mexico

Performance credits
RBD – all vocals

Musicians
Güido Laris – bass
Mauricio Soto Lartigue – drums
Martino Schramm – guitar
Eduardo Téllez Sierra – keyboards

Production

Camilo Lara –  A&R
Melissa Mochulske –  A&R coordination
Güido Laris –  arrangements, musical director
Grako Gilbert –  authoring
Pedro Damián –  executive producer
Carlos Lara –  executive producer
Luis Luisillo Miguel –  associate producer
Emilio Ávila –  executive producer (concert)
Hula Hula –  graphic design, additional photography
Marisol Alcelay –  marketing, product manager
Armando Ávila –  mixer
Raúl González Biestro –  DVD mixing, production
Raúl Oropeza –  DVD mixing engineer
Carolina Palomo Ramos –  production coordinator
Melissa Mochulske –  DVD coordination
Mara Arakelian –  DVD coordination
Sofía Diez de Bonilla –  DVD coordination
Armando Ávila –  producer
Andrew Rose –  recording assistant
Juan Carlos Moguel –  additional recording
Ricardo Trabulsi –  photographer
Gabriel Alarcón – additional photography
Víctor Deschamps – additional photography

Charts and certifications

Weekly charts

Year-end charts

Certifications

Release history

See also
Tour Generación RBD En Vivo (Album)

References

RBD video albums